Pouteria brevipetiolata is a species of plant in the family Sapotaceae. It is endemic to Ecuador.

References

Flora of Ecuador
brevipetiolata
Endangered plants
Taxonomy articles created by Polbot